Manuela Soto Sosa (born February 8, 1991) is a Swiss-Uruguayan multidisciplinary artist. She is known for her work in tattoo, illustration, design, and art direction. In 2018, she designed the cover art for the single "When the party's over" by the American signer Billie Eilish.

Early life 
Manuela Soto Sosa was born in Yverdon-les-Bains, Switzerland to a Swiss mother and a Uruguayan political refugee father of Charrúa descent.
She was raised in Lausanne, Switzerland where she studied illustration and started tattooing in 2010 at age 18.

Career

Tattoo 

Soto Sosa began her career as a tattoo artist in 2010 under the name "Soto Gang". Her artistic style is influenced by Japanese anime, Chicano fine line tattooing and an aesthetic from the 1990s and 2000s promoting self-love and empowerment. In 2018, V magazine described her as "The Cardi B of Tattoo Artistry". From 2014 to 2018 she went on a world tour tattooing in Europe, Asia and the United States.
In 2018, she moved to Los Angeles, California and co-founded Sang Bleu LA, the third branch of the Sang Bleu tattoo studios. In the same year, she designed Billie Eilish's "When the party's over" single cover. Two years later, in 2020, she stepped down from her position as co-owner of Sang Bleu LA and opened Softflex, a multi-disciplinary creative studio located downtown Los Angeles.

Fashion 

In 2019, Soto Sosa launched a clothing brand named Soto Worldwide. She has collaborated on capsule collections and merchandise design with Billie Eilish, Lil Miquela, Flossgloss, Sean Pablo's Paradise NYC.

Art exhibitions

References 

1991 births
Living people
21st-century Swiss women artists
Swiss people of Uruguayan descent